Kletsko-Pochtovsky is a rural locality (a khutor) and the administrative center of Kletsko-Pochtovskoye Rural Settlement, Serafimovichsky District, Volgograd Oblast, Russia. The population was 1,065 as of 2010. There are 25 streets.

Geography 
Kletsko-Pochtovsky is located 69 km east of Serafimovich (the district's administrative centre) by road. Otrozhki is the nearest rural locality.

References 

Rural localities in Serafimovichsky District